Lewis Franklin (L.F.) Payne Jr. (born July 9, 1945) is an American businessman, politician and lobbyist who served as a member of the United States House of Representatives from the Commonwealth of Virginia from 1988 to 1997.

Biography
Payne was born in Amherst, Virginia. He is a graduate of the Virginia Military Institute and is a veteran and former officer of the U.S. Army. He also earned an M.B.A. from the University of Virginia. Prior to entering Congress, he was the founder and president of Wintergreen Resort.

Congress 
Payne was elected as a Democrat to the 100th United States Congress, in a special election to fill the vacancy caused by the death of Representative Dan Daniel. Payne legislated as a conservative Democrat and was reelected to the four succeeding Congresses (serving from June 14, 1988 to January 3, 1997).

In 1994, his share of the vote fell sharply. Payne retired from Congress in 1997 and ran for lieutenant governor in that same year. He lost a close general election contest to John H. Hager, failing to overcome the tide of Jim Gilmore's gubernatorial victory over Democrat Don Beyer.

Later career 
He then joined McGuireWoods Consulting, a Washington, D.C.-based government relations and lobbying firm associated with the Richmond-based law firm McGuireWoods, LLP.

Electoral history

1988 - Payne was elected to the U.S. House of Representatives with 59.3% of the vote in a special election, defeating Republican Linda L. Arey; Payne was re-elected with 54.19% of the vote in the general election, defeating Republican Charles Robert Hawkins and Independent J.F. Cole.
1990 - Payne was re-elected unopposed.
1992 - Payne was re-elected with 68.9% of the vote, defeating Republican W.A. Hurlburt
1994 - Payne was re-elected with 53.28% of the vote, defeating Republican George C. Landrith.

External links

1945 births
Living people
People from Amherst, Virginia
Virginia Military Institute alumni
Democratic Party members of the United States House of Representatives from Virginia
University of Virginia Darden School of Business alumni
United States Army officers
McGuireWoods people
Members of Congress who became lobbyists